Maguda palpalis is a moth of the family Noctuidae first described by Francis Walker in 1865. It is found in Sri Lanka.

Its body is darker brown in color.

References

Moths of Asia
Moths described in 1865